Jeremy England is an American physicist who uses statistical physics arguments to explain the spontaneous emergence of life, and consequently, the modern synthesis of evolution. England terms this process "dissipation-driven adaptation".

Early life 
England's mother was the daughter of Polish Jewish Holocaust survivors while his father was a non-observant Lutheran. England was born in Boston and raised in a college town in New Hampshire. He was raised Jewish but did not study Judaism until he attended graduate school at Oxford University. He now considers himself an Orthodox Jew.

England earned a bachelor's degree in biochemistry from Harvard in 2003. After being awarded a Rhodes Scholarship, he studied at St. John's College, Oxford, from 2003 until 2005. He earned his Ph.D. in physics at Stanford in 2009. In 2011, he joined the Massachusetts Institute of Technology Physics Department as an Assistant Professor. In 2019, he joined GlaxoSmithKline as a Senior Director in artificial intelligence and machine learning.

Theoretical work 
England has developed a hypothesis of the physics of the origins of life, that he calls 'dissipation-driven adaptation'. The hypothesis holds that random groups of molecules can self-organize to more efficiently absorb and dissipate heat from the environment. His hypothesis states that such self-organizing systems are an inherent part of the physical world.

Pulitzer-Prize winning science historian Edward J. Larson said that if England can demonstrate his hypothesis to be true, "he could be the next Darwin."

In popular culture 
A fictionalized version of England and his 'dissipation-driven adaptation' theory features in Dan Brown's novel Origin. England, who is an Orthodox Jew and trained Rabbi, has written that he strongly rejects Brown's depiction of him as being a scientist who is unconcerned with spiritual matters.

Awards 
England shared APS 2021 Irwin Oppenheim Award with Sumantra Sarkar. He is also listed in a Forbes "30 under 30" in science.

England was selected as Rhodes Scholar in 2003. Also in 2003, the Hertz Foundation awarded England a Hertz Fellowship.

See also
 Energy rate density
 Maximum power principle
 Howard T. Odum

References

 Forbes.com seems to have lost most of the content on his profile and lists a broken link to the 2012 30-under-30 in Science. The Hertz Foundation profile mentions the 2018 Forbes 30-under-30.  However, neither the 2012 nor the 2018 official listing pages on Forbes.com list England.

Further reading

External links
Lab website
Jeremy England discusses his theory of pre-biological evolution and the emergence of complexity in non-living systems - Interview on the 7th Avenue Project radio show
What is life: lecture by Jeremy England on 9 September 2014 at the Karolinska Institutet

1982 births
Living people
American Orthodox Jews
American people of Polish-Jewish descent
21st-century American physicists
Jewish physicists
Massachusetts Institute of Technology School of Science faculty
Harvard College alumni
Stanford University alumni
American Rhodes Scholars
Alumni of St John's College, Oxford